Do Piran (also Romanized as Do Pīrān; also known as Deh-e Pīrān) is a village in Jannat Makan Rural District, in the Central District of Gotvand County, Khuzestan Province, Iran. At the 2006 census, its population was 121, in 24 families.

References 

Populated places in Gotvand County